Rajendra Kumar Singh is an Indian politician and a member of the Indian National Congress party.

Political career
He became an MLA in 2013, for the sixth time.

Personal life
He is married to Ranjana Kumari Singh and has two sons.

Awards and recognition
He was a part of the Indian Contingent for World Peace Council in the year 1980 and toured Russia, Bulgaria and Romania.

See also
Madhya Pradesh Legislative Assembly
2013 Madhya Pradesh Legislative Assembly election
2003 Madhya Pradesh Legislative Assembly election
1993 Madhya Pradesh Legislative Assembly election
1980 Madhya Pradesh Legislative Assembly election

References

External links

Indian National Congress politicians from Madhya Pradesh
1950 births
Living people